The Chhattisgarh football team is an Indian football team representing Chhattisgarh in Indian state football competitions including the Santosh Trophy.

References

Santosh Trophy teams
Football in Chhattisgarh